Dreams is the second solo album by Grace Slick, released by RCA Records in March 1980. One single, "Seasons", was released in the United States to promote the record; In the United Kingdom, the track "Dreams" was issued as a single, reaching No. 50 on the chart and No. 104 in the United States on the Billboard Bubbling Under Hot 100 chart. It was recorded in New York without any previous or current members of Jefferson Starship. The album reached no. 32 on the Billboard charts; it also reached no. 28 on the UK album chart.

Track listing

Charts

Personnel
Grace Slick – vocals, piano on "Garden of Man"
Ron Frangipane – conductor on "Dreams", "Seasons", "Let It Go", and "Garden of Man", Oberheim synthesizer player on "Dreams" and "Garden of Man"
Frank Owens – solo piano on "Dreams"
Scott Zito – lead guitars on "Face to the Wind" and "Let It Go", electric guitar on all other tracks except "Seasons", acoustic guitar on "El Diablo" and "Seasons", bottleneck guitar on "Do It the Hard Way", vocals on "Angel of Night"
Sol Ditroia – rhythm electric guitar on "Face to the Wind", acoustic guitar on all other tracks except "Dreams" and "Angel of Night",  guitar solo on "El Diablo"
George Wadenius – 2nd lead electric guitar on "Face to the Wind", electric guitar on "Do It the Hard Way" and "Full Moon Man", acoustic guitar on all other tracks except "Dreams" and "Angel of Night"
Neil Jason – electric bass on "Dreams", guitar on "El Diablo", Fender bass on "El Diablo", bass on all other tracks
Allan Schwartzberg – drums
Jim Malin – percussion on all tracks except "Dreams" and "Garden of Man"
Joe D'Elia – piano on "Face to the Wind", "Seasons", "Do It the Hard Way" and "Let It Go", solo piano on "Full Moon Man"
Geoff Farr – Oberheim synthesizer programmer on "Dreams" and "Garden of Man"
Gene Orloff – concertmaster on "Dreams"
Artie Kaplan – orchestra contractor on "Dreams", "Seasons", "Let It Go" and "Garden of Man", baritone saxophone on "Full Moon Man"
Edward Walsh – Oberheim synthesizer on "El Diablo", "Face to the Wind", "Full Moon Man", "Let It Go" and "Garden of Man"
Celebration Singers – chorus on "Seasons"
Harry Lookofsky – concertmaster on "Seasons", "Let It Go" and "Garden of Man"
Dave Tofani – tenor saxophone on "Full Moon Man"
Phil Bodner – tenor saxophone on "Full Moon Man"
Ronnie Cuber – baritone saxophone on "Full Moon Man"
Joe Shepley – solo piccolo trumpet on "Let It Go"
Steve Price – drums on "Garden of Man"
George Devens – percussion on "Garden of Man"
David Feiedman – percussion on "Garden of Man"

Production
Ron Frangipane – producer, arrangements
Ed Sprigg – engineer
Jon Smith, Alex Kasbevaross – assistant engineers
Grace Slick – album concept
Gribbitt (Tim Bryant), J. J. Stelmach, RCA – art direction
Ron Slenzak – cover photo
Big Weasel (Skip) Johnson – management

References

External links

Grace Slick albums
1980 albums
RCA Records albums